Rakta Nadir Dhara is a 1994 Indian Bengali action film directed by Ram Mukherjee starring Chiranjeet Chakraborty, Prosenjit Chatterjee, Debashree Roy and Sabyasachi Chakraborty in the lead roles. The film was bankrolled by Rano Mukhopadhyay. The score and soundtrack were composed by Bappi Lahiri.

Plot
Andaman based criminal Jaga Gunda (Goon) is an international terrorist. Police officer Rupen Roy arrests him and is directed by the court to imprison him for 21 years. However, Jaga escapes from jail with the help of a corrupt cop Sachin and kills Rupen Roy's family. Rupen's only child is alive because he lives in a missionary school. Jaga also kills the judge and the witness of the case. Their sons unite together and avenge the death of their family.

Cast
 Prosenjit as Partho
 Chiranjeet Chakraborty as Rupen Roy / Roni
 Debashree Roy
 Sabyasachi Chakraborty as Abinash
 Chinmoy Ray as Witness
 Dulal Lahiri as Jaga
 Debraj Ray as Minister
 Nirmal Kumar as Rupen's father
 Anamika Saha
 Soumitra Bandyopadhyay as Sachin
 Bodhisattva Mazumdar as Dibakar
 Ashok Mukherjee

Music 

The film's musical album comprises 7 tracks all composed by Bappi Lahiri. Venus Worldwide Entertainment bagged the audio rights. The songs upon release garnered positive reviews and topped the musical charts.

Track listing

See also 
 Bhai Amar Bhai, 1996 Indian Bengali film

References

External links 
 

1994 films
Bengali-language Indian films
Indian action films
1990s Bengali-language films
Films directed by Ram Mukherjee
1994 action films
Films scored by Bappi Lahiri